The south wind is the wind that originates from the south and blows north.

South Wind may also refer to:
 South Wind (film), 2018 Serbian film
 , 2021 Serbian film
 South Wind (TV series), 2020 Serbian TV series
 South Wind (novel), by Norman Douglas
 South Wind (train), which operated between the U.S. city of Chicago and the state of Florida from 1940 to 1971

See also 
 Južni Vetar (disambiguation) (Serbian for "South Wind")
 Southwind Drum and Bugle Corps a Drum Corps International Open Class (formerly Division II/III) corps from Mobile, Alabama